Bowser Valley is a valley that encloses a small glacier at the headwall, lying east of Crawford Valley in the Saint Johns Range of Victoria Land. Named by the Advisory Committee on Antarctic Names in 2005 after Samuel S. Bowser, Division of Molecular Medicine, New York State Department of Health, who conducted research of giant foraminifera in McMurdo Sound for ten field seasons from 1984 to 2004.

References

Valleys of Victoria Land